Taizhou Yuanda Football Club was a professional Chinese football club. The team was based in Taizhou, Jiangsu.

Taizhou Yuanda was dissolved after the 2020 season.

Notable players

Africa
Nigeria
 Daniel Chima Chukwu

Europe
Croatia
 Marko Bašić
Serbia
 Zoran Tošić

Coaching staff

Results
All-time league rankings

As of the end of 2020 season.

Key
 Pld = Played
 W = Games won
 D = Games drawn
 L = Games lost
 F = Goals for
 A = Goals against
 Pts = Points
 Pos = Final position

 DNQ = Did not qualify
 DNE = Did not enter
 NH = Not Held
 WD = Withdrawal
 – = Does Not Exist
 R1 = Round 1
 R2 = Round 2
 R3 = Round 3
 R4 = Round 4

 F = Final
 SF = Semi-finals
 QF = Quarter-finals
 R16 = Round of 16
 Group = Group stage
 GS2 = Second Group stage
 QR1 = First Qualifying Round
 QR2 = Second Qualifying Round
 QR3 = Third Qualifying Round

References

External links
Official website of Taizhou Yuanda

Defunct football clubs in China
Association football clubs established in 2017
2017 establishments in China
2021 disestablishments in China
Association football clubs disestablished in 2021
Sport in Jiangsu
Taizhou, Jiangsu